Second Lieutenant Trevor LeBlanc is a fictional character on the Lifetime television series Army Wives, portrayed by Drew Fuller. Trevor is married to former Alabama bartender Roxy LeBlanc. Together, they have two children, Finn and T.J., whom Trevor legally adopted as his own. Roxy becomes pregnant with the couple's first child in Season 3, but miscarries in Season 4. In Season 6, the couple learns they're having twins.

Background
Trevor's biological mother died when he was three and his alcoholic biological father left him with social workers days later and is currently serving life for murder. By his own statement, he has not seen his biological father since he was in elementary school. He was in and out of foster homes until age seven when he was adopted. Little is revealed about his background in between then and up to his marriage to Roxy, although there is a brief mention of him having family in Georgia. A skilled handyman, he was an apprentice carpenter in high school and has occasionally helped the other wives and Roland fix their cars and assemble furniture amongst other things.

Storylines
When the show premiered Trevor was a Private First Class. He asks Roxy to marry him, the two having met just four days prior. In the pilot episode he was notified by then-MAJ Frank Sherwood of his acceptance into Jump School and becomes a qualified paratrooper. At the end of Season 1 Trevor is deployed to Iraq on his first tour and is promoted to Specialist while overseas.

He returns home in Season 2 after being injured. While patrolling a public marketplace with his buddy PFC Dalton Wilkins he noticed an insurgent hiding a machine gun underneath his bisht and alerted the public in time just as the insurgent took his weapon out and fired. Trevor managed to kill the insurgent but took a bullet to his shoulder in the process. After returning from Iraq it is announced that he is to be awarded the Silver Star for his heroism. He was uncomfortable with the attention as he felt he should not be awarded for killing another human being or for acting on taught instinct. He walked out on a televised interview when the reporter began asking inappropriate questions and was formally reprimanded by Brigadier General Michael Holden in his office, although Michael does not take any punitive action and instead bans reporters from interviewing Trevor. His shoulder takes longer to recover than he hopes and the doctor declared him unfit for immediate return to combat. He also develops an addiction to pain killers while recovering at home, which worsened after learning that PFC Wilkins was killed in action. He gets professional help when he realizes that he has been alienating his boys as a result. After the awards ceremony he gives his Silver Star to PFC Wilkins' widow.

Until he is declared physically fit for duty, he takes a job as the assistant to then-LTC Joan Burton. In the episode "Sacrifices" he is cleared by the doctor to return to combat. However Joan's maternity replacement, the equally headstrong LTC Evan Connor, filled Trevor's spot in his unit without consulting Joan or the doctor. Instead he is transferred to a different unit and promoted to CPL, making him a non-commissioned officer. He unknowingly found himself in between Joan and LTC Connor used him several times to get back at Joan, much to Trevor's annoyance and displeasure. In Season 3, during the annual Fort Marshall war games, he helps LTC Burton stage a trap to expose LTC Connor's underhand tactics; Connor is later transferred out at Major General Michael Holden's request. Later that season he passes the promotion board and is made SGT by the episode "Operation: Tango". At LTC Burton's recommendation he accepts the offer to become a recruiter, which was also motivated by his desire to spend more time with Roxy and the boys.

While working for Joan, Trevor adopts Lucky, a dog Jeremy Sherwood had managed to smuggle back from Iraq with the help of a friend, much to Roxy's chagrin. The boys took to Lucky immediately but Roxy was initially adverse to the idea as she disliked pets. Lucky becomes a welcome distraction for her and the boys over the next few seasons, especially when Trevor is deployed.

In Season 4, Trevor receives new orders to be transferred back to frontline duty and is made a squad leader ahead of the upcoming deployment to Afghanistan. Trevor's new squad includes Jeremy Sherwood and his two buddies PFC Riggs and SPC Giron and, despite the relatively short amount of time spent together, he quickly gains their trust and respect. In the episode "Army Strong", the entire 23rd Airborne Division, headquarters included, is deployed to Afghanistan. Trevor's platoon is charged with aiding a squad of Afghan National Army soldiers on an interdiction mission in Kandahar Province to disrupt Taliban transportation lines. During fierce gunfight against Taliban fighters he witnessed Jeremy's death from a RPG.

While in Afghanistan, Trevor is notified by a fellow NCO that he is on the promotion list for Staff Sergeant. However, after redeploying home Frank recommends him for Officer Candidate School (OCS). In the season finale, he is notified by Frank of his acceptance into OCS and is commissioned as a Second Lieutenant during the time frame between the end of Seasons 5 and the beginning of Season 6.

During his deployment Trevor became distant from Roxy, especially after she continued with her plans to build the truck stop despite his misgivings. Their falling out was exacerbated by Roxy's inability to deal with TJ's rebellious streak and false rumors that she was having an affair after Whit's truck was seen outside their house all night. After returning home he sleeps on the couch and then puts up at a buddy's apartment to avoid her. They sort out their differences when the "cold war" began to affect his performance during training.

By Season 6, with the disbandment of the 23rd Airborne Division, Trevor is transferred to the 32nd Airborne Division, which had moved in from the hurricane-affected Fort Hope. He also earned his Ranger tab. As a 2LT he becomes a platoon leader in Bravo Company. He gets a housing upgrade and the family moves into a double-story house. Roxy also finds out that she is pregnant with twins. In the 100th episode Roxy gives birth to twin boys Wyatt and Drew. Wyatt is born vaginally without complications but the cord is wrapped around Drew's neck and Roxy has to have an emergency cesarean section. Drew is put in an incubator in NICU, while Roxy gets to go home with Wyatt. Not long after, Drew finally gets to go home.

Not long after the twins' birth Trevor is assigned to the 2nd Ranger Battalion at Fort Lewis and moves with the family to Tacoma, Washington.

Characterization
Trevor is characterized as a family man who loves and dotes on his wife and sons. He legally adopts Roxy's two sons, Finn and Tobias Jack "TJ", who took his last name, and loves them like his own. Since then the boys have taken to him and he can often be seen playing with them on weekends or reading to them before bedtime.

Trevor generally tries to keep his work and family life as separate as possible and does not talk about it unless pushed or when necessary. He rarely discusses details of his deployments with Roxy, especially after his last tour in Afghanistan and witnessing Jeremy Sherwood's death. In Season 6, when pressed by Roxy about the controversy surrounding the Africa mission, he tells her, "There's a lot I never told you. There's a lot I wish I never knew."

Actress Sally Pressman, who portrays Roxy LeBlanc, described Trevor as "the all-American dream guy".

Awards and decorations
The following are the medals and service awards fictionally worn by Lieutenant LeBlanc.

See also
Quotes

References

External links
 Trevor LeBlanc at Lifetime

Army Wives characters
Fictional United States Army personnel
Fictional Iraq War veterans
Fictional War in Afghanistan (2001–2021) veterans
Fictional lieutenants
Fictional military sergeants
Fictional characters from South Carolina
Television characters introduced in 2007

ka:ჰეილი ჯეიმს სკოტი
sr:Хејли Џејмс-Скот